Sir Roland Thomas Nugent, 1st Baronet (19 June 1886 – 18 August 1962), was an Ulster Unionist Party politician from Northern Ireland. He was a member of the Senate of Northern Ireland from 1936 until his resignation in 1961. He served as Deputy Speaker (1938–1939 and 1944), Leader (1944–1950) and Speaker (1950–1961).

Born in Portaferry, Nugent studied at Eton College, Trinity College, Cambridge, and the University of Bonn. He joined the diplomatic service in 1910, transferring to the Foreign Office in 1913. During World War I, he served with the Grenadier Guards.

Director of the Federation of British Industries 1916-17 and 1919–32.

Having been knighted in 1929 he was created a baronet in 1961. He married Cynthia Maud Ramsden, daughter of Captain Frederick William Ramsden and Lady Elizabeth Maud Conyngham (the daughter of The 3rd Marquess Conyngham) on 25 September 1917. The couple had three children; both his sons were killed in action in the Second World War:   
 Elizabeth Anne Nugent (born 10 March 1919)
 Lieutenant Patrick Edmund Charles Nugent (4 November 1920 – 27 April 1943)
 Lieutenant John Andrew Nugent (1 September 1925 – 5 October 1944)

References

1886 births
1962 deaths
People from Portaferry
Lord-Lieutenants of Down
Members of the Privy Council of Northern Ireland
Members of the Senate of Northern Ireland 1933–1937
Members of the Senate of Northern Ireland 1937–1941
Members of the Senate of Northern Ireland 1941–1945
Members of the Senate of Northern Ireland 1945–1949
Members of the Senate of Northern Ireland 1949–1953
Members of the Senate of Northern Ireland 1953–1957
Members of the Senate of Northern Ireland 1957–1961
Northern Ireland Cabinet ministers (Parliament of Northern Ireland)
Baronets in the Baronetage of the United Kingdom
Ulster Unionist Party members of the Senate of Northern Ireland